Henry of England (6 May 1268 – 14 October 1274 in Merton, Surrey) was the fifth child and second son of Edward I of England by his first wife, Eleanor of Castile.

Early years
Henry was born in Windsor Castle during the reign of his paternal grandfather, Henry III of England. On 3 August 1271, Henry's older brother John died in the custody of their paternal granduncle Richard, 1st Earl of Cornwall. His death left Henry the eldest surviving child of Edward and second-in-line to the throne of England. Henry III died on 16 November 1272. Edward became King of England and Henry his heir apparent. In 1273, Henry was betrothed to Joan I of Navarre.

Death
When Henry lay dying at Guildford in 1274, neither of his parents made the short journey from London to see him. He was tended by his grandmother, Eleanor of Provence, who had raised him during the four years his parents were on Crusade. The queen dowager was thus at that moment more familiar to him than his parents, and the better able to comfort him in his illness. Since Henry was always sickly, the gravity of his illness was perhaps not realised until it was too late for his parents to reach him. He died of natural causes and was buried in Westminster Abbey.

Ancestry

Sources 

1268 births
1274 deaths
13th-century English people
Heirs to the English throne
Heirs apparent who never acceded
House of Plantagenet
Burials at Westminster Abbey
Sons of kings
Children of Edward I of England
Royalty who died as children